Dudley Observatory is an astronomical observatory originally located in Albany, New York, and now in Loudonville, New York. It is no longer operating as a scientific observatory, but remains the oldest non-academic institution of astronomical research in America. The Observatory was chartered on February 11, 1852 by the New York State Senate, and by the New York State Assembly on April 3, 1852.
It was named for Charles E. Dudley of Albany, a former United States Senator (1828–1833) and member of the Albany Regency. Dudley lived in New York State, died in 1841, and his widow Blandina Bleeker Dudley endowed the Dudley Observatory after his death.

Dudley is part of the coalition of institutions comprising Union University.  Other institutions include Albany College of Pharmacy, Albany Law School, Albany Medical College, and the Graduate College of Union University.

Dudley Observatory has operated at two different observing sites since its founding. The first began construction in 1852, on a rise to the north-east of downtown Albany that was locally known as "Goat Hill".  The building was dedicated on August 28, 1856 prior to its completion, with Edward Everett delivering the keynote oration. By the 1890s, railroad traffic around the original building had grown to the point where the vibrations were disrupting the astronomical instruments.  The original building was sold to the city of Albany, and new property was purchased on the grounds of the Albany Alms-House.

After World War II, Dudley began a transition from astronomical observation to research for the space race.  Consequently, the second observatory was sold to Albany Medical Center in 1963 and an office building was purchased at 100 Fuller Road, near the University at Albany. This phase lasted until the end of the space race, when funding from NASA dried up.  The Fuller Road office was rented to the University in 1976.  The Observatory made additional moves, first to Schaffer Heights building in Schenectady, then to the MiSci museum of science in Schenectady. and finally to their current location in Roger Bacon Hall at Siena College.

The Observatory has evolved from a research to an educational foundation.  In 2019, the archival collection was donated to the New York State archives, which had the resources to catalog and preserve the Observatory's documents.  A collection of scientific hardware, including a Brashear refracting telescope and equatorial mount, were donated to the New York State Museum in Albany.  The Dudley Observatory maintains a collection of rare books including first editions by Galileo and Copernicus.  As part of its efforts to enhance its outreach capabilities, in late 2019 the Dudley Observatory moved to Siena College in nearby Loudonville, N.Y.

See also 
Henry Fitz
List of astronomical observatories

References

External links 

Union College's description of Union University
Dudley Observatory homepage

Private universities and colleges in New York (state)
Buildings and structures in Schenectady, New York
Astronomical observatories in New York (state)
1852 establishments in New York (state)